Per Eilert Elofsson (born 2 April 1977 in Röbäck, Västerbotten) is a Swedish former cross-country skier who competed from 1997 to 2004. He won a bronze medal in the 10 km + 10 km combined pursuit at the 2002 Winter Olympics in Salt Lake City.

Elofsson also won five medals at the FIS Nordic World Ski Championships with three golds (2001: 15 km, 10 km + 10 km combined pursuit; 2003: 10 km + 10 km double pursuit), one silver (2001: 4 × 10 km relay), and one bronze (2003: 4 × 10 km relay).

He also won the 50 km event at the Holmenkollen ski festival in 2001. This success along with his two golds earned at the 2001 FIS Nordic World Ski Championships in Lahti would give Elofsson the Svenska Dagbladet Gold Medal. At the 2002 Swedish Sports Award, he was awarded the prize for Sportsman of the Year.

In 2005 he made an unexpected appearance on the album Grand Illusion by the Heavy metal band Nocturnal Rites, playing guitar on one song.

He retired 26 October 2005 by giving a press conference at Arlanda airport.

After retirement
In 2007, Elofsson started working as a business developer at Swedbank, giving financial advice to professional athletes. His first client was fellow cross-country skier Charlotte Kalla. He left Swedbank in April 2016.

Elofsson was a pundit and expert commentator for SVT Sport during cross-country championships. During the 2014 Winter Olympics he was employed by Swedish broadcaster Viasat. In November 2014 he left Viasat and joined Eurosport.
.

Cross-country skiing results
All results are sourced from the International Ski Federation (FIS).

Olympic Games
 1 medal – (1 bronze)

World Championships
 5 medals – (3 gold, 1 silver, 1 bronze)

World Cup

Season titles
 2 titles – (2 overall)

Season standings

Individual podiums
 11 victories – (11 )
 23 podiums – (23 )

Team podiums
 4 victories – (3 , 1 )
 10 podiums – (9 , 1 )

References

External links

Holmenkollen winners since 1892 - click Vinnere for downloadable pdf file 
 

1977 births
Living people
Sportspeople from Umeå
Cross-country skiers from Västerbotten County
Cross-country skiers at the 1998 Winter Olympics
Cross-country skiers at the 2002 Winter Olympics
Holmenkollen Ski Festival winners
Swedish male cross-country skiers
Olympic medalists in cross-country skiing
Olympic bronze medalists for Sweden
FIS Nordic World Ski Championships medalists in cross-country skiing
FIS Cross-Country World Cup champions
Medalists at the 2002 Winter Olympics
IFK Umeå skiers